Homosexuality and the Western Christian Tradition is a 1955 book about the history of Christianity and homosexuality by the theologian Derrick Sherwin Bailey.

Reception
The medieval historian John Boswell described Homosexuality and the Western Christian Tradition as a "pioneering study". He wrote that almost all "modern historical research on gay people in the Christian West" has depended upon it and that it was still the best work on its subject in print. However, he wrote that it, "suffers from an emphasis on negative sanctions which gives a wholly misleading picture of medieval practice, is limited primarily to data regarding France and Britain, and has been superseded even in its major focus, biblical analysis."

The gay scholar John Lauritsen described Homosexuality and the Western Christian Tradition as the work of a Christian apologist who pleads for greater tolerance while "striving to exonerate the Church from her historic culpability in fostering intolerance".

See also
 Christianity, Social Tolerance, and Homosexuality

References

Bibliography
Books

 
 

1955 non-fiction books
Books about LGBT history
English-language books
History books about Christianity
LGBT literature in the United Kingdom
1950s LGBT literature
Longman books